Cyprus competed at the 2016 Winter Youth Olympics in Lillehammer, Norway from 12 to 21 February 2016.

Alpine skiing

Girls

See also
Cyprus at the 2016 Summer Olympics

References

2016 in Cypriot sport
Nations at the 2016 Winter Youth Olympics
Cyprus at the Youth Olympics